is a Japanese retired track and field sprinter who specialized in the 400 metres. His personal best in the event was 46.00 seconds set in Tokyo in 2013. He competed in the 4 × 400 metres relay at the 2013 World Championships.

Personal best

International competition

National titles

References

External links

Kengo Yamasaki at JAAF 
Kengo Yamasaki at TBS 
Kengo Yamasaki at Monteroza  (archived)

1992 births
Living people
Japanese male sprinters
Sportspeople from Ibaraki Prefecture
World Athletics Championships athletes for Japan
Competitors at the 2013 Summer Universiade
Nihon University alumni
21st-century Japanese people